FC Ala-Buka is a Kyrgyzstani football club based in Ala-Buka that plays in the top division the Kyrgyzstan League.

History 
19??: Founded as FC Dinamo Ala-Buka.
1999: Dissolved
2016: Refounded as FC Ala-Buka.

Achievements 
Kyrgyzstan League:
6th place: 1998

Kyrgyzstan Cup:

Current squad

External links 
Career stats by KLISF

Football clubs in Kyrgyzstan